Mhango is a surname. It may refer to:

Banele Mhango (born 2003), South African chess master and coach.
Bazuka Mhango (born 1939), Malawian lawyer, educator and politician
Nkwazi Mhango (1965), Tanzanian author and academic 
Gabadinho Mhango (born 1992), Malawian international footballer
Geoffrey Du Mhango, Malawian economist, author, and politician
Winston Mhango (born 1988), Zimbabwean footballer
Yvonne Mhango, Malawian economist

Others
Margaret Mhango Mwanakatwe, Zambian politician and government minister